The table below shows the 2003 Tennis Masters Series schedule.

The ATP Masters Series are part of the elite tour for professional men's tennis organised by the Association of Tennis Professionals.

Results

Titles Champions

Singles

See also 
 ATP Tour Masters 1000
 2003 ATP Tour
 2003 WTA Tier I Series
 2003 WTA Tour

External links 
 Association of Tennis Professionals (ATP) official website

ATP Tour Masters 1000